Il-Kantilena is the oldest known literary text in the Maltese language. It dates from the 15th century (no later than 1485, the death of its author, and probably from the 1470s), but was not found until 1966 by historians Godfrey Wettinger and Mikiel Fsadni. The poem is attributed to Pietru Caxaro, and was recorded by Caxaro's nephew, Brandano, in his notarial register (Dec. 1533 – May 1563). It is preserved at the Notarial Archives in Valletta.

Although written in Maltese, in Latin script, it was a very early form that had not yet been influenced much by Romance languages, and is thus an example of Old Maltese. This text contains many Arabic morphemes. The only Romance words are vintura 'luck', sometimes translated into English as 'fate', and et 'and'. In general, early Maltese texts contain very little non-Semitic vocabulary; even in later texts, poetry tends to use more Semitic vocabulary than general language use does, therefore while certainly of historical interest, Il-Kantilena most likely does not reflect the spoken language of the common Maltese of the time, but rather that of the elite who spoke a stilted form more pleasing to the ruling class.

However, literary evidence suggests that the spoken language in the 13th century was Arabic since ire was raised when the bishop of Malta resident in Sicily appointed Italian-speaking priests to the island. Both islands were occupied by the Arabs in the early medieval period, but Malta's relative isolation limited the diffusion of Italian cognates until much later. 



Text

 Original orthography

 Modern orthography

 Modern Standard Arabic orthography

Approximate English translation
Witness my predicament, my friends (neighbours), as I shall relate it to you:
[What] never has there been, neither in the past, nor in your lifetime,
A [similar] heart, ungoverned, without lord or king (sultan),
That threw me down a well, with broken stairs
Where, yearning to drown, I descend the steps of my downfall,
I climb back up and down again, always faced with high seas.

It (she) fell, my building, its foundations collapsed;
It was not the builders’ fault, but the rock gave way,
Where I had hoped to find rock, I found loose clay
It (she) fell, my edifice, (that) which I had been building for so long.

And so, my edifice subsided, and I shall have to build it up again,
You change it to the site that suits her/it
Who changes his place, changes his fate!
for each (piece of land) has its own shape (features);
there is white land and there is black land, and red
But above all, (what) you want from it is a fruit.

References

Bibliography

External links
Il Cantilena
"Il-Kantilena ta' Pietru Kaxaru"  talk by the Akkademja tal-Malti on Campus FM. 
Il Cantilena: How much can a modern Arab decipher is a translation of the Cantilena using similarity to classical and contemporary Arabic, by an Arabic speaker.
Mejju ġie bil-Ward u Zaħar, the second oldest known document in Maltese (nearly 200 years younger than the Cantilena)

Maltese literature
Maltese-language literature
15th-century poems
Earliest known manuscripts by language
15th century in Malta